Lansdowne Centre (formerly Lansdowne Park Shopping Centre) is a shopping mall in Richmond, British Columbia, Canada. It is located on No. 3 Road and is the second-largest mall in Richmond after Richmond Centre.

History
Lansdowne Centre mall was built on a horse racing track originally called Lansdowne Park. The shopping mall that exists today was constructed in 1977 as Lansdowne Park Shopping Mall, with the now-defunct Woodward's as one of its first tenants.

The mall will be demolished in 2025 as part of a  development, consisting of 24 towers.

Stores 
The mall has 120+ stores and services. Anchor stores include Best Buy, HomeSense, Jysk, Toys "R" Us, Winners, Dollarama, and T&T Supermarket which replaced Target as a result of the Target Canada failure.

Food chains include A&W, Bubble Waffle Cafe, Grill King, KFC, and Villa Vietnamese.

References

External links
 Lansdowne Centre (official website)
 Tourism Richmond - shopping

Shopping malls in Metro Vancouver
Shopping malls established in 1977
Buildings and structures in Richmond, British Columbia
1977 establishments in British Columbia